Thomas Albert McFarlane (9 July 1890 – 20 April 1967) was a New Zealand cricketer. He played first-class cricket for Otago between 1909 and 1920.

A middle-order batsman and useful bowler, McFarlane made 60 and 10 and took 3 for 85 in Otago's innings loss to Auckland in the Plunket Shield in 1909–10. Still aged only 19, he was selected in the first of the two matches New Zealand played against Australia later that season, but had no success. 

In March 1912, playing senior club cricket in Dunedin for Albion, he scored 211 in about 105 minutes out of the team's final total of 285; his innings included eight sixes. In 1914 The Otago Daily Times cricket columnist "Long Slip" said McFarlane had "all, or nearly all, the essentials of a great batsman" but was let down by his "lack of restraint". 

He served with New Zealand forces at Gallipoli in the First World War. In the 1920s excessive drinking led to his imprisonment.

References

External links
 

1890 births
1967 deaths
New Zealand cricketers
Pre-1930 New Zealand representative cricketers
Otago cricketers
Cricketers from Dunedin
New Zealand military personnel of World War I